Andy McDermott is a retired American soccer midfielder who played professionally in the USL A-League before becoming an actor, writer, and sports entertainment executive.   McDermott has also coached at several different levels for more than 25 years.  He was Head Coach of the Varsity Boys at Broad Ripple High School in Indianapolis.  He was Assistant Coach at Northwestern University.  At the club level, he was the Director of Coaching at the Solano United Soccer Club in Northern California, coached for the US Development Academy in Los Angeles and the Chicago Sockers.  He earned his National A-Youth Coaching License from US Soccer.

In 1994, McDermott graduated from William Fremd High School.  He played collegiate soccer at Northwestern University from 1994 to 1997.  As a soccer player, he was named All Big-Ten three years, Team Captain three years, and finished as the all-time assist record holder and NSCAA All-American Midwest Region. In 1998, McDermott signed with the Chicago Stingers of the USISL D-3 Pro League.  The Stingers won the 1998 league championship.  In 1999, the Stingers renamed themselves the Chicago Sockers and moved down to the USL Premier Development League. Chicago again won the league title, as McDermott scored a goal in the 3-1 victory over the Spokane Shadow. In February 2000, McDermott moved up to the Indiana Blast of the USL A-League.  In 2002 and 2003, he served as Team Captain of the A-League side the Charlotte Eagles in North Carolina.

While playing seven seasons of professional soccer in Germany, Chicago, Indianapolis, and Charlotte, Andy spent his down time training in the martial arts, earning his Third-Degree Black Belt and was the Head Instructor of a taekwondo school. After 9/11, he served on the Tactical Response Unit of the Phoenix Police Department for 9 years.  Besides tactical operations and pro-active community policing, he also served as a certified translator in Spanish and in French, a Peer Counselor for PTSD and other trauma, and as Subject Matter Expert and Physical Training Instructor for all Arizona Law Enforcement Agencies. While there, he competed in the World Police and Fire Games and in 2012 he won the Gold Medal at the National Championships in the event called Toughest Competitor Alive.

While working as a cop in Phoenix, he was discovered as an acting talent when the feature film "Everything Must Go" (starring Will Ferrell) was filmed in Scottsdale.  He generated enough interest to launch his career into Los Angeles, where over four years he appeared in over 30 National film and television productions, 15 commercials, and many print campaigns.  The globally-successful video game Call Of Duty: Black Ops 3 featured McDermott on the cover and in the game's artwork. .  He became known as a Sports Performance and Fitness Expert- with over 100 published articles and videos for national media including Men’s Fitness, Muscle & Fitness, and USA Today, among others. His training and nutrition content on YouTube has been viewed by 4.5 million people.

In 2017, McDermott relocated to the San Francisco area when he was recruited to create and lead a $50MM Sports Technology and Entertainment startup, called COPA Soccer Training Center. During this time Andy also served as Director of Coaching for Solano United Soccer Club where he was responsible for the development of roughly 1500 student-athletes, four of whom were his two sons and two daughters.    

He and Julie were married in 1999, and along with their four kids and giant lazy dog, they have returned to the Chicago area after 20 years of adventures to create and lead Intentional Sports.  Andy speaks English, Spanish, and French.

References

External links
Official website
 

Living people
1976 births
American soccer players
Charlotte Eagles players
Chicago Sockers players
Indiana Blast players
Northwestern Wildcats men's soccer players
USL Second Division players
A-League (1995–2004) players
USL League Two players
Male models from Illinois
American exercise instructors
Male actors from Illinois
Association football midfielders